Yrjö Ilmari Keinonen (31 August 1912, in Ruskeala – 29 October 1977, in Nurmijärvi) was a Finnish General of the Infantry and Knight of the Mannerheim Cross. He was the Chief of Defence of the Finnish Defence Forces between 1965 and 1969.

General Keinonen was the only Chief of Defence to be forced to resign in-term. When he was selected for the position, his formal qualifications were excellent, and he was unambiguously supported by President Kekkonen. A contemporary, Lieutenant Colonel Tiilikainen, devotes an entire chapter to the reasons why he resigned in his book about the Cold War in Finland. Officially, the explanation was neglect of duties, working only an estimated 90 days annually. However, there was widespread resentment against him, both in the forces and later revealed in other memoirs from other generals. This hints towards a more serious accusation, defeatism. Namely, Tiilikainen speculates that due to the Finno-Soviet Treaty of 1948, Keinonen believed that a Soviet occupation was eventually inevitable. Thus, the remaining task of the Chief of Defence was to be some sort of a Finnish General Philippe Pétain, doing only damage control, and thus active defence planning was unnecessary.

References

1912 births
1977 deaths
People from Sortavalsky District
People from Viipuri Province (Grand Duchy of Finland)
Chiefs of Staff (Finnish Defence Forces)
Finnish generals
Finnish military personnel of World War II
Knights of the Mannerheim Cross